"Miss Fantasia Preaches" was the third single released by the Irish ska pop quartet, The Blizzards. It was taken from their debut album, A Public Display of Affection. The song received extensive airplay on national radio throughout the summer and became an instant chart hit when released. It was released on 18 August 2006 when it charted in Ireland at #9, spending two weeks in the Irish Singles Chart. The  song is based on the local sex shop in Mullingar Butterfly Kisses

Chart performance
"Miss Fantasia Preaches" spent two weeks in the Irish Singles Chart in 2006. It entered the chart at #9 staying there for one week.

References

External links
 Official website
 Lyrics/Song Meaning
 Video of live performance at Bud Rising, Marlay Park in 2007

2006 singles
The Blizzards songs
Song recordings produced by Michael Beinhorn
2006 songs